Events from the year 1905 in Denmark.

Incumbents
 Monarch – Christian IX
 Prime minister – Johan Henrik Deuntzer (until 14 January), J. C. Christensen

Events

 1 January – Ekstra Bladet is published for the first time. Politikens Ekstrablad had been published since 12 February 1904
 27 March – The Royal Danish Academy of Music's new building on H.C. Andersens Boulevard in Copenhagen is inaugurated.
 31 May – The watchtower in Copenhagen Zoo is inaugurated.
 25 June – The school ship Georg Stage is in a collision with the English steamship Ancona in Hollænderdybet, resulting in Georg Stage sinking and the deaths of 22 aspiring sailors.
 12 September – The current Copenhagen City Hall is inaugurated.
 20 November – A delegation from the Norwegian Storting is received by Christian IX who gives his consent to the election of Prince Carl (his grandson) as King of Norway under the name Haakon VII.

Undated

Sports
 23 July  Thorvald Ellegaard wins silver in men's sprint at the 1905 UCI Track Cycling World Championships.

Births
2 May – Paul Høm, artist (died 1994)
21 October – Mads Clausen, industrialist, founder of Danfoss (died 1966)
16 December – Piet Hein, scientist, mathematician, inventor, designer, author, and poet (died 1996)

Deaths
 5 March – Ludvig Fenger, architect (born 1833)
 10 March – Harald Conradsen, sculptor and medalist (born 1817)
 13 May  Valdemar Gætje, master baker and the first director of the Union of Danish Employers and Master Craftsmen (born 1795)
 31 July  Theodor Wessel, businessman (born 1842)

References

 
Denmark
Years of the 20th century in Denmark
1900s in Denmark
Denmark